Manuela Díez Jiménez (1786 - 1858) was a key female figure in the forming of the Dominican independence. She was the mother of Juan Pablo Duarte, the founder of the Dominican Republic, or the so-called father of the nation. She greatly supported the rise of the secret society "La Trinitaria" by hiding its members and organizing meetings, which eventually lead to the liberation of the nation.

Biography 
Manuela Díez Jiménez was born on the 26th of June, 1786 in El Seibo, Dominican Republic.

Around 1800, she married Juan José Duarte, who later became the father of Juan Pablo Duarte, and seven other children. Manuela had three brothers - Antonio, Mariano and José Acupérnico. Her daughter Rosa Duarte Promártir is considered one of the most influential Dominican women ever born.

During 1801, due to Toussaint Louverture's invasion she was forced to immigrated to Mayaguez, Puerto Rico. She didn't return until 1809, in which year the Dominican Republic became a Spanish colony once again.

Manuela Jiménez supported the rise of the secret society "La Trinitaria" by actively hiding its members and organizing secret meetings.

This led to her being persecuted by a raid for her contribution to the political life of her children and their accomplices. On the 3rd of March 1845, she was expelled from the country and she fled from the Haitian government to Venezuela.

She died in 1858 on the 31st of December in Caracas, Venezuela.

Literary appearances 
In the poem by Ramón Emilio Jiménez mentions Manuela Díez Jiménez one of the responsible figures for the formation of Juan Pablo Duarte's patriotic character to lead the nation.

Honors 
There is a street in Santo Domingo, named after her. Moreover, there are more than a few schools in Dominican Republic in which she is named patron and they bear her name.

References 

1786 births
1858 deaths
People from El Seibo Province
Dominican Republic people of Spanish descent
Dominican Republic emigrants to Venezuela
Dominican Republic independence activists
Dominican Republic Roman Catholics
White Dominicans